Fernando Pereira (10 May 1950 – 10 July 1985) was a freelance Portuguese-Dutch photographer, who drowned when French intelligence (DGSE) detonated a bomb and sank the Rainbow Warrior, owned by the environmental organisation Greenpeace on 10 July 1985.

The bombing of the boat had been designed to make the ship unsalvageable. The first smaller bomb bent the propeller shaft, making repair uneconomic. Pereira stayed inside the boat to get his camera and other pieces of equipment. The second, more powerful explosion, designed to sink the boat, caused a huge inrush of seawater that drowned Pereira.

The Rainbow Warrior led a flotilla of yachts protesting against French nuclear testing at Mururoa Atoll in the Tuamotu Archipelago of French Polynesia and was about to depart Auckland for a campaign of legal demonstrations in international waters near the French military operational areas at Moruroa Atoll.

Subsequent updates
On the twentieth anniversary of the sinking, it was revealed that the French president François Mitterrand had personally authorized the bombing. Admiral Pierre Lacoste made a statement saying Pereira's death weighed heavily on his conscience. Also on that anniversary, Television New Zealand sought to access a video record made at the preliminary hearing where the two agents pleaded guilty. The footage has remained sealed on the court record since shortly after the conclusion of the criminal proceedings. The two agents oppose release of the footage – despite having both profited from writing books themselves on the incident – and have taken the case to the New Zealand Court of Appeal and, subsequently, the Supreme Court of New Zealand.

In 2006, Antoine Royal, brother of the French presidential candidate Ségolène Royal, revealed in an interview that their brother, Gérard Royal, a former French intelligence officer, had been the agent who put the bombs on the Rainbow Warrior.

Photographs by Pereira

References

External links

 "Death of a Rainbow Warrior," 10 July 2005 (20th anniversary), Greenpeace website.
 www.rainbow-warrior.org.nz – article on the twentieth anniversary (2005).
 "The French Secret Service Agents – Where  Are They Now?" - Greenpeace archives
  "New Zealand won't reopen Rainbow Warrior case" – New York Times (3 October 2006)
 France Must Pay Greenpeace $8 Million in Sinking of Ship New York Times (3 October 1987)
 France, Despite Wide Protests, Explodes a Nuclear Device New York Times (6 September 1995)
"Fernando Pereira, 1950 – 1985"- Greenpeace International

1950 births
1985 deaths
People from Chaves, Portugal
Portuguese photographers
Dutch photographers
Dutch people of Portuguese descent
Dutch people murdered abroad
People murdered in New Zealand
Deaths by drowning in New Zealand
Sinking of the Rainbow Warrior
People associated with Greenpeace
Environmental killings
People killed in French intelligence operations